The Ylikiiminki Church is an evangelical Lutheran church in Ylikiiminki, Oulu.

The wooden cruciform church has been designed by Jacob Rijf, an Ostrobothnian architect and builder of churches. The church was completed in 1786.

References

External links 

Lutheran churches in Oulu
Churches completed in 1786
Wooden churches in Finland
Neoclassical church buildings in Finland